Rashida Riffat is a Pakistani politician who has been a Member of the Provincial Assembly of Khyber Pakhtunkhwa, since May 2013.

Education
Riffat has graduated in Journalism.

Political career

She was elected to the Provincial Assembly of Khyber Pakhtunkhwa as a candidate of Jamaat-e-Islami Pakistan on a reserved seat for women in 2013 Pakistani general election.

In September 2013, she was appointed as parliamentary secretary in Khyber Pakhtunkhwa Assembly without a department until she was discharged in November 2013.

In May 2016, she joined a resolution to establish a Women's Caucus in the Provincial Assembly of Khyber Pakhtunkhwa. She also joined a resolution to declare 8 July as Charity Day in honour of Abdul Sattar Edhi.

References

Living people
Jamaat-e-Islami Pakistan politicians
Year of birth missing (living people)